The Big Eight Conference is a defunct college athletic conference that was formerly affiliated with the NCAA's Division I-A (now known as FBS).

The Big Eight Conference was a successful football conference, with its member schools being recognized as consensus national champion on eleven occasions, including the last two football seasons the conference existed (1994 and 1995).  Seven players from the Big Eight won the Heisman Trophy, the most prestigious national award for college football players.

Membership timeline

History
The conference was formed in 1907 as the Missouri Valley Intercollegiate Athletic Association (MVIAA) by five charter schools: the University of Kansas, University of Missouri, University of Nebraska, University of Iowa, and Washington University in St. Louis. After the MVIAA grew to ten schools, six state schools split away on their own in 1928, becoming known as the "Big Six": Iowa State, Kansas, Kansas State, Missouri, Nebraska and Oklahoma. The University of Colorado was added in 1948, and the conference became known as the "Big Seven Conference". Oklahoma State joined in 1958, becoming the eighth and final member. The conference broke up when its members joined the Big 12 Conference in 1996.

Due to its common history with the Missouri Valley Conference, Big Eight championships from 1907 through 1927 are also claimed by the MVC.

Bowl games
The first Big Eight conference team to attend a bowl game was Missouri, at the 1924 Los Angeles Christmas Festival.  Following the 1938 season Oklahoma became the second to attend a bowl game, at the fifth-annual Orange Bowl in Miami, Florida.  In 1951 and 1952 the conference had a brief ban on its members attending bowl games. When the conference resumed accepting invitations in 1953, its champion regularly thereafter attended the Orange Bowl.  This tradition was broken only five times: 1964 (when Nebraska faced #2 Arkansas in the Cotton Bowl); 1966 (when Nebraska faced #3 Alabama in the Sugar Bowl); 1973 and 1974 (when undefeated Oklahoma was on probation and barred from bowl games); and 1995 (when #1 Nebraska played in the Bowl Alliance championship vs. #2 Florida at the Fiesta Bowl).

At the 1979 Orange Bowl, #6 Nebraska and #4 Oklahoma were paired against each other in a rematch of their conference game earlier in the season.

Rankings
In the 1971 NCAA University Division football season, Big Eight teams finished ranked #1 (Nebraska), #2 (Oklahoma) and #3 (Colorado) in the nation in the AP Poll – the only time in college football history teams from one conference have held the top three spots in the final poll.  In the final AP Poll issued before the Big Eight became the Big 12, half of the conference's teams were ranked in the nation's top 10 (#1 Nebraska, #5 Colorado, #7 Kansas State, #9 Kansas).

Rivalries
The Nebraska–Oklahoma football rivalry was one of the most significant in the nation, with national title implications involved during many seasons.  The 1971 Nebraska vs. Oklahoma football game is commonly referred to as "The Game of the Century."

With common histories dating back even before the 1907 formation of the conference, many of the Big Eight's rivalries were among the most-played in college football.  At the time the Big Eight Conference dissolved in 1996, the conference had the two longest uninterrupted series in Division I-A football: Kansas–Oklahoma (played annually since 1903) and Kansas–Nebraska (played annually since 1906).  Many of the conference's series began in the 19th century, including:
 Kansas–Missouri, first played in 1891 (second-most played series in Division I-A in 1996)
 Nebraska–Kansas, first played in 1892
 Nebraska–Missouri, first played in 1892
 Missouri–Iowa State, first played in 1896
 Nebraska–Iowa State, first played in 1896
 Kansas–Iowa State, first played in 1898
All of the above series except Kansas-Iowa State have been inactive since at least 2012 due to conference realignment.

Champions

Conference champions
Following are the MVIAA/Big Eight football conference champions from 1907 to 1995 (shared championship years are shown in italics):

 † Kansas would have won the 1960 title, but after found to be using an ineligible player they were forced to forfeit their victories over Missouri and Colorado, which meant that Missouri was awarded the 1960 Big Eight title.

 ‡ Oklahoma initially won the 1972 title, but after it was found that they used ineligible players, they were penalized by the NCAA, though they did not force OU to forfeit games. The Big Eight asked them to forfeit three games and awarded the title to Nebraska, but Oklahoma still claims these wins and this title.

National championships
Big Eight football teams were recognized as national champion on eleven occasions, including four times as back-to-back champions:
 1950 – Oklahoma
 1955 – Oklahoma
 1956 – Oklahoma
 1970 – Nebraska (AP; UPI coaches conducted final poll prior to bowl games and awarded championship to Texas)
 1971 – Nebraska
 1974 – Oklahoma (AP; ineligible for UPI coaches poll championship due to NCAA probation. USC named champion of coaches poll)
 1975 – Oklahoma
 1985 – Oklahoma
 1990 – Colorado (AP; UPI coaches poll championship awarded to Georgia Tech)
 1994 – Nebraska
 1995 – Nebraska

Accolades
The Big Seven Conference established a Coach of the Year award in 1948.  The conference began awarding a Player of the Year award in 1967, and began giving separate offensive and defensive awards in 1971.  The final awards were given after the 1995 season, after which all of the Big Eight schools entered the Big 12 Conference.

Conference Coach of the Year

 1948: Bud Wilkinson, Oklahoma
 1949: Bud Wilkinson, Oklahoma†
 1950: Bud Wilkinson, Oklahoma†
 1951: Bud Wilkinson, Oklahoma†
 1952: Bud Wilkinson, Oklahoma†
 1953: Bud Wilkinson, Oklahoma†
 1954: Bud Wilkinson, Oklahoma†
 1955: Bud Wilkinson, Oklahoma†
 1956: Dallas Ward, Colorado 
 1957: Chuck Mather, Kansas 
 1958: Dan Devine, Missouri
 1959: Clay Stapleton, Iowa State 
 1960: Dan Devine, Missouri†
 1961: Sonny Grandelius, Colorado
 1962: Bob Devaney, Nebraska
 1963: Bob Devaney, Nebraska†
 1964: Bob Devaney, Nebraska†
 1965: Eddie Crowder, Colorado
 1966: Jim Mackenzie, Oklahoma
 1967: Chuck Fairbanks, Oklahoma
 1968: Pepper Rodgers, Kansas & Dan Devine, Missouri†
 1969: Floyd Gass, Oklahoma State
 1970: Bob Devaney, Nebraska†
 1971: Johnny Majors, Iowa State
 1972: Al Onofrio, Missouri
 1973: Tom Osborne, Nebraska (AP) & Barry Switzer, Oklahoma (?)
 1974: Barry Switzer, Oklahoma†
 1975: Bud Moore, Kansas (AP) & Tom Osborne, Nebraska (?)†
 1976: Earle Bruce, Iowa State (AP)
 1977: Earle Bruce, Iowa State
 1978: Tom Osborne, Nebraska†
 1979: Jimmy Johnson, Oklahoma State
 1980: Tom Osborne, Nebraska (AP)†
 1981: Don Fambrough, Kansas
 1982: Jim Dickey, Kansas State
 1983: Warren Powers, Missouri (AP) & Tom Osborne, Nebraska (Coaches)†
 1984: Mike Gottfried, Kansas
 1985: Bill McCartney, Colorado
 1986: Barry Switzer, Oklahoma†
 1987: Barry Switzer, Oklahoma†
 1988: Tom Osborne, Nebraska†
 1989: Bill McCartney, Colorado†
 1990: Bill Snyder, Kansas State (AP) & Bill McCartney, Colorado (Coaches)†
 1991: Bill Snyder, Kansas State (AP)† & Glen Mason, Kansas (?)
 1992: Tom Osborne, Nebraska†
 1993: Bill Snyder Kansas State (AP)† & Tom Osborne, Nebraska (Coaches)†
 1994: Tom Osborne, Nebraska†
 1995: Glen Mason, Kansas†

† Repeat winner

Conference Players of the Year

 1967: Granville Liggins, Oklahoma
 1968: Steve Owens, Oklahoma
 1969: Steve Owens, Oklahoma†
 1970: Jerry Murtaugh, Nebraska
 1971: Greg Pruitt, Oklahoma
 1972 Offensive:  George Amundson, Iowa State 
 1972 Defensive: Rich Glover, Nebraska
 1973 Offensive:  Joe Washington, Oklahoma 
 1973 Defensive: Lucious Selmon, Oklahoma
 1974 Offensive:  Joe Washington, Oklahoma†
 1974 Defensive: Rod Shoate, Oklahoma
 1975 Offensive: Nolan Cromwell, Kansas
 1975 Defensive: Lee Roy Selmon, Oklahoma
 1976 Offensive: Terry Miller, Oklahoma State
 1976 Defensive: Clete Pillen, Nebraska
 1977 Offensive: Terry Miller, Oklahoma State†
 1977 Defensive: George Cumby, Oklahoma
 1978 Offensive: Billy Sims, Oklahoma
 1978 Defensive: John Corker, Oklahoma State
 1979 Offensive: Billy Sims, Oklahoma†
 1979 Defensive: George Cumby, Oklahoma†
 1980 Offensive: Phil Bradley, Missouri
 1980 Defensive: Derrie Nelson, Nebraska
 1981 Offensive: Dave Rimington, Nebraska
 1981 Defensive: Jeff Gaylord, Missouri 
 1982 Offensive: Mike Rozier, Nebraska
 1982 Defensive: Rick Bryan, Oklahoma
 1983 Offensive: Mike Rozier, Nebraska†
 1983 Defensive: Rick Bryan, Oklahoma†
 1984 Offensive: Danny Bradley, Oklahoma
 1984 Defensive: Leslie O'Neal, Oklahoma State
 1985 Offensive: Thurman Thomas, Oklahoma State
 1985 Defensive: Brian Bosworth, Oklahoma
 1986 Offensive: Jamelle Holloway, Oklahoma
 1986 Defensive: Brian Bosworth, Oklahoma†
 1987 Offensive: Thurman Thomas, Oklahoma State†
 1987 Defensive: Danté Jones, Oklahoma
 1988 Offensive: Barry Sanders, Oklahoma State
 1988 Defensive: Broderick Thomas, Nebraska
 1989 Offensive: Darian Hagan, Colorado (Tie)
 1989 Offensive: Gerry Gdowski, Nebraska (Tie)
 1989 Defensive: Alfred Williams, Colorado
 1990 Offensive: Eric Bieniemy, Colorado
 1990 Defensive: Alfred Williams, Colorado†
 1991 Offensive: Tony Sands, Kansas
 1991 Defensive: Joe Bowden, Oklahoma
 1992 Offensive: Calvin Jones, Nebraska
 1992 Defensive: Deon Figures, Colorado
 1993 Offensive: Charles Johnson, Colorado
 1993 Defensive: Trev Alberts, Nebraska
 1994 Offensive: Rashaan Salaam, Colorado
 1994 Defensive: Ed Stewart, Nebraska
 1995 Offensive: Tommy Frazier, Nebraska
 1995 Defensive: Tim Colston, Kansas State

† Repeat winner

All-time all-conference team
After the final Big Eight season was completed in 1995, a panel of twelve longtime observers selected an all-time conference team:

Heisman Trophy winners

Seven players from the Big Eight won the Heisman Trophy, the most prestigious national award for college football players:

 1952: Billy Vessels (HB), Oklahoma
 1969: Steve Owens (FB), Oklahoma
 1972: Johnny Rodgers (WR/RB), Nebraska
 1978: Billy Sims (RB), Oklahoma
 1983: Mike Rozier (RB), Nebraska
 1988: Barry Sanders (RB), Oklahoma State
 1994: Rashaan Salaam (RB), Colorado

AFCA Coach of the Year
 1949: Bud Wilkinson, Oklahoma
 1989: Bill McCartney, Colorado
 1994: Tom Osborne, Nebraska

FWAA (Eddie Robinson) Coach of the Year
 1971: Bob Devaney, Nebraska
 1989: Bill McCartney, Colorado

References
General
BigEightSports.com list of football champions

Specific